David Pereira da Costa (born 5 January 2001) is a Portuguese professional footballer who plays as a winger for Ligue 1 club Lens.

Early life 
Born in Portugal as one of six children, Costa moved to France at the age of 9.

Club career
On 10 January 2019, Costa signed his first professional contract with Lens. He made his professional debut in a 2–0 Ligue 1 win over Saint-Étienne on 3 October 2020. He scored his first goal on 3 March 2021 against Saint-Étienne.

On 23 June 2021, Costa extended his contract with Lens to 2024.

International career
Born in Portugal, Costa is of Cape Verdean descent. He is a youth international for Portugal, having played up to the Portugal U21s.

References

External links
 
 RC Lens Profile
 
 
 

2001 births
Living people
Sportspeople from Almada
Portuguese footballers
Portugal under-21 international footballers
Portugal youth international footballers
Portuguese sportspeople of Cape Verdean descent
Association football wingers
RC Lens players
Ligue 1 players
Ligue 2 players
Championnat National 2 players
Portuguese expatriate footballers
Portuguese expatriate sportspeople in France
Expatriate footballers in France